Elana is an unincorporated community in Roane County, West Virginia, United States.  Its elevation is 840 feet (246 m).

The community was named after a brand of face powder.

References

Unincorporated communities in Roane County, West Virginia
Unincorporated communities in West Virginia